Odin Township is located in Marion County, Illinois, United States. As of the 2010 census, its population was 1,722 and it contained 735 housing units.

The first Euro-American settler came to Odin Township in 1827.

Geography 
Odin Township (E½ T2N R1E) is centered at 38°36'N 89°4'W (38.364, -89.059). It is transversed east–west by U.S. Route 50. The city of Odin is located in the eastern part of the township. Prior to 1896 Odin Township included what is now Sandoval Township.

Demographics

Adjacent townships 
 Carrigan Township (north and northwest)
 Tonti Township (northeast)
 Salem Township (east)
 Raccoon Township (southeast)
 Centralia Township (south and southwest)
 Sandoval Township (west)

References

External links
US Census
City-data.com
Illinois State Archives

Townships in Marion County, Illinois
Populated places established in 1827
Townships in Illinois
1827 establishments in Illinois